Portugal took part at the Eurovision Song Contest 1993 in Millstreet, Ireland, represented by Anabela with the song "A cidade (até ser dia)". Anabela was selected through the annual Festival da Canção, Portugal's Eurovision selection show, to represent the country at the contest in Ireland.

Before Eurovision

Festival da Canção 1993 
The Portuguese broadcaster, Rádio e Televisão de Portugal (RTP), used the popular Festival da Canção to select their entry for the Eurovision Song Contest 1993.

Format 
The format for the 1993 Portuguese selection was similar to that of the previous year, but with a few adjustments. Once again, there would be five semi-finals, and the qualifiers were chosen by a panel of five judges (among them former Eurovision participants Fernando Tordo, who competed in 1973, and Dulce Pontes, who competed in 1991; and future Eurovision participant Rita Guerra, who would represent her country in 2003). However, there were now four songs in each semi, and the top eight songs across all five semi-finals would compete in the final. The semi-finals were hosted by Júlio Isidro.

Semi-finals

Final 
The final was held on 11 March 1993 at the São Luiz Theatre in Lisbon and was hosted by António Sala and Margarida Mercês de Medo. The winner was decided through the votes of 22 regional juries.

The winner was "A cidade (até ser dia)," sung by Anabela and written by Pedro Abrantes, former Eurovision entrant Paulo de Carvalho, and Marco Quelhas. The song was arranged by the song writer's brother Fernando Abrantes, who also performed it at the piano live on stage together with the singer Anabela during the Eurovision final in Ireland.

At Eurovision
Anabela performed 11th on the night of the contest, following Austria and preceding France. She received 60 points in total, placing 10th in a field of 25. It was the first time since 1976 that Portugal received twelve points from any other countries, with both the Netherlands and Spain awarding Portugal their highest score. Portugal themselves awarded twelve points to France.

Voting

References

1993
Countries in the Eurovision Song Contest 1993
Eurovision